Detective Lieutenant Andrew Flynn is a fictional character, originally featured on TNT's crime drama The Closer. Portrayed by Tony Denison, Flynn appears in all seven seasons of the James Duff-created crime procedural (2005-2012), before subsequently becoming a regular character on its successor series, Major Crimes (2012-2018).

In-universe

Career history
Originally a member of the LAPD Robbery/Homicide Division (commanded by then-Captain Taylor), who sent him to "assist" (sabotage) Deputy Chief Brenda Leigh Johnson's team. Flynn was originally antagonistic to Deputy Chief Johnson;  but, after Commander Taylor blamed him for a mishandled investigation that nearly ended his career and Brenda proved his innocence, he transferred to Deputy Chief Johnson's team on a permanent basis and gained respect for her. He was forced further into her debt due to the mishandling of another investigation (with Lt. Provenza) and was forced by Deputy Chief Johnson to repay the squad for helping keep him and Provenza out of trouble with the department. In the episode "Homewrecker", Flynn identifies himself in the opening crime scene video sequence as "Andrew Flynn, PhD (Priority Homicide Division)." In the Major Crimes episode "Risk Assessment", Flynn tells Rusty Beck he became a cop because he was nearly arrested for stealing a motorcycle and decided he'd rather put criminals behind bars than end up there himself. He later tells Provenza in "Chain Reaction" that he thinks about retiring everyday but has given too much to the job to do it; namely, a good relationship with his children and his faith in most of humanity.

Personality
An influential man, Flynn has the ability to persuade fellow detectives and officers into taking his side on political and LAPD-related matters. He originally preferred to take the easy way out when it comes to solving crimes, which led to mistakes. When in trouble, he often tries to talk his way out of it by asking and answering a series of rhetorical questions which inevitably make things worse. Flynn can sometimes be disloyal and sometimes fails to keep his word. He has difficulty keeping secrets, and he perpetually has a toothpick in his mouth. Flynn has a fiery temper but can be protective of his co-workers and his daughter, Nicole.

Personal life
After then-Captain Taylor accused him of botching an old case, Flynn began to realize that his commanding officer was not as loyal as he previously thought.
Angered by Taylor's accusations, Flynn decided that he wanted to permanently join Johnson's team after she defends him in the matter. Although he initially looked for ways to sabotage Dep. Chief Johnson, Flynn now has a growing respect for her, and increasingly works with her, rather than against her. He is close to Lt. Provenza (Denison and G.W. Bailey are friends in person as on-screen). He was an alcoholic and is a participant in Alcoholics Anonymous, trying to make amends with his family. He has been sober for 14 years and now prefers to drink cranberry juice with soda. In the episode "Dial 'M' for Provenza" he mentions that Provenza has been married five times, but he has been married only once. During the seven seasons of "The Closer" both Flynn and Provenza remained unmarried. Flynn has an adult daughter named Nicole from whom he is estranged. Flynn initially refused to go to her wedding when she wanted both him and her step-father whom Flynn hates to walk her down the aisle. However, Captain Sharon Raydor convinced him to go, and he took her as his date. Since then, he seems to have developed a closer relationship with Nicole, with her even visiting him once in a while.

While Flynn initially had a rocky relationship with Captain Sharon Raydor, the two became close friends and he took her to his daughter's wedding and the Nutcracker. However, the two maintained they were just friends to his daughter Nicole despite Rusty Beck pointing out just how often they have dinner. Flynn and Raydor seemed surprised by this and Sharon asked Rusty about it, and he told her they're "not dating" several times a month. In Season 4's episode Snitch, Flynn decides to ask Sharon out on a proper date, which she accepts. In Hostage of Fortune, they inform Chief Taylor of their relationship. In the Season 5 premiere, they discuss moving in together and look at houses in the following episodes. In Family Law, Flynn sells his house and moves into Sharon and Rusty's condo.

In "White Lies, Part 3", Andy suffers a heart attack. He is shown to have survived in "Heart Failure" and is on desk duty until he is cleared by his doctor.

In Dead Drop, Flynn proposes to Sharon, and in the next episode it's announced that they are officially engaged. They are married in "Sanctuary City, Part 5."

In "Conspiracy Theory, Part 4," Sharon's cardiomyopathy causes her heart to seize; she cannot be revived and dies. Andy is left a widower and has to be helped to a chair by Rusty, which leads to Andy himself nearly collapsing.

In the "By Any Means" four-part arc, Andy struggles with his grief over Sharon's death and the return of Phillip Stroh. Determined to keep his word to Sharon that he will protect Rusty, Andy returns to work early and struggles to balance protecting Rusty and being too overprotective. Now the second-in-command of Major Crimes, Andy becomes determined to kill Stroh, even if he is surrendering to ensure Rusty's safety.

After Stroh is killed by Rusty, Provenza is given permanent command of Major Crimes and Julio takes a promotion to Lieutenant and a transfer to the Criminal Intelligence Division. Andy remains the second-in-command of Major Crimes and announces an intention to take over Julio's old desk once he finishes out his interrupted bereavement leave.

Awards and decorations
The following are the medals and service awards fictionally worn by Lieutenant Flynn. It is incorrectly thought that the top ribbon depicts the red white and blue LAPD Liberty Award, however, this ribbon is only award to K-9 officers. The ribbon must represent the 1984 Olympics which has the same color and patterning, but with the addition of a gold emblem on top of the white center. The same ribbon is also found on Assistant Chief Russell Taylor's uniform.

References

External links
   Lieutenant Andy Flynn fan website

Fictional Los Angeles Police Department detectives
The Closer characters
Fictional police lieutenants